An inline blowback is a type of blowback design. A blowback marker is one that when the trigger is pulled, the sear is released, which allows the striker, which is linked to the bolt, to slam into the valve, which releases air into the bolt, which is redirected out the barrel. The valve also releases air back into the striker, pushing it back and recocking the marker. 
An inline blowback is where the bolt, striker, and valve are all adjacent horizontally in the same tube, instead of in a stacked tube blowback where the valve and striker are in one tube, and the bolt is in another tube above the valve and striker.

The blowback design in general is the most affordable way of making a semi automatic paintball marker, that doesn't need the use of compressed air/nitrogen or any type of regulation on gas.

Operation
The operation of an inline blowback marker can be separated into four stages:
 Ready:
The compressed mainspring puts pressure on the striker, often called a hammer or "rear bolt", which is held in place by the sear. The bolt is linked to the striker by the linkage arm, and held clear of the feed neck, which allows a paintball to drop into the chamber.
 Chamber:
The sear is depressed or "tripped" by the trigger, which releases the striker and allows the mainspring to push it forward. The linkage arm causes the bolt to move forward as well, pushing the paintball into the end of the barrel and sealing off the feed tube. This is where any misfed paintballs will be chopped.
 Strike:
The striker hits the seal pin on the valve, opening the cup seal inside and allowing compressed gas to escape. A portion of this gas flows through the space between the seal pin and the valve, forcing the striker backwards and resealing the cup seal.
 Fire:
The remainder of the gas flows around the valve through wide grooves milled in its sides and is channeled by the power tube to flow out the center of the bolt, propelling the paintball. The power tube usually has a screw in front of the valve which is twisted to restrict the flow of gas and change the final velocity of the paintball. Once the striker is forced back far enough, the sear catches it and the marker is back at the "ready" stage.

Ideally, the firing stage will complete before the feed tube is reopened. This prevents gas from venting out the tube instead of propelling the ball, which would require a greater volume of gas to bring the ball to the correct velocity. However, this is not the sign of a sloppy marker, as a slight pressure on the paintballs in the feed tube can help "unjam" standard  gravity-fed hoppers. Some of the most common inline blowback markers are made by Tippmann.

Advantages
 Simple, straightforward design.
 Shorter height than stacked blowback designs.
 Uses few moving parts.
 Low cost, due to fewer parts and easier milling.

Disadvantages
 Removing internal parts is more difficult than stacked blowback designs.
 Longer body than stacked blowback designs.
 Heavy, fast-moving striker can cause more recoil than other designs.

Basic troubleshooting
Some inline blowback markers will leak air from the barrel when uncocked. The striker sits forward against the seal pin, causing the cup seal to open enough to leak air from the valve, which escapes out the barrel. Pull the charging handle or knob to pull back the striker and remove the pressure from the seal pin. However, during storage, you should always remove the air source and leave the marker uncocked. The rear spring can be damaged if stored a long time in a cocked position.

Paintball markers